Jacob Voigt may refer to 
Jaap Voigt (born 1941), Dutch field hockey player
Jacob Voigt House in Mequon, Wisconsin, United States.